There are several rivers named Manso River.

Argentina
 Manso River (Argentina and Chile)

Brazil
 Manso River (Goiás)
 Manso River (Mato Grosso)
 Manso River (Minas Gerais)

See also 
 Manso (disambiguation)